Vicente Bachero Castells (6 January 1905 – 1938) was a Spanish racing cyclist. He rode in the 1935 Tour de France. He was killed in the Battle of the Ebro in 1938.

Major results
1932
 4th Overall Vuelta a la Comunidad Valenciana
1933
 8th Overall Volta a Catalunya
1934
 2nd Overall Vuelta a Mallorca
1st Stage 1

References

External links
 

1905 births
1938 deaths
Spanish male cyclists
Military personnel killed in the Spanish Civil War
People from Onda
Sportspeople from the Province of Castellón
Cyclists from the Valencian Community